Dragan Lepinjica (born 15 August 1961) is a former Serbian football player.

Born in Šid, he played with Osijek, Dinamo Zagreb and Priština in the Yugoslav First League during the 1980s, and in 1990 he moved to Portugal where he played with União in the Primeira Liga until 1996.

His son Ivan, born in 1999, is also a footballer.

References

External sources
 Dragan Lepinjica at Povijest Dinama
 Yugoslav First and Second League stats at B92

1961 births
Living people
People from Šid
Yugoslav footballers
Serbian footballers
Serbian expatriate footballers
Yugoslav First League players
Primeira Liga players
NK Osijek players
GNK Dinamo Zagreb players
FC Prishtina players
C.F. União players
Expatriate footballers in Portugal
Serbian expatriate sportspeople in Portugal
Expatriate footballers in Croatia
Serbian expatriate sportspeople in Croatia
Expatriate footballers in Kosovo
Serbian expatriate sportspeople in Kosovo
Association football forwards